A Commissioners' church is an Anglican church in the United Kingdom built with money voted by Parliament as a result of the Church Building Act 1818, and subsequent related Acts.  Such churches have been given a number of titles, including "Commissioners' Churches", "Waterloo Churches" and "Million Act Churches".  In some cases the Commissioners provided the full cost of the new church; in other cases they provided a grant and the balance was raised locally.  This list contains the Commissioners' churches in the East of England and in South East England.

Key

Churches

See also
List of Commissioners' churches in the English Midlands
List of Commissioners' churches in London
List of Commissioners' churches in Northeast and Northwest England
List of Commissioners' churches in southwest England
List of Commissioners' churches in Wales
List of Commissioners' churches in Yorkshire

References
Notes

Bibliography

 Eastern England
Commissioners' churches in eastern England
 Commissioners' churches